Deuteronomy is the fifth book of the Torah (in Judaism), where it is called  and the fifth book of the Christian Old Testament.

Chapters 1–30 of the book consist of three sermons or speeches delivered to the Israelites by Moses on the Plains of Moab, shortly before they enter the Promised Land. The first sermon recounts the forty years of wilderness wanderings which had led to that moment and ended with an exhortation to observe the law. The second sermon reminds the Israelites of the need to follow Yahweh and the laws (or teachings) he has given them, on which their possession of the land depends. The third sermon offers the comfort that, even should the nation of Israel prove unfaithful and so lose the land, with repentance all can be restored. 

The final four chapters (31–34) contain the Song of Moses, the Blessing of Moses, and the narratives recounting the passing of the mantle of leadership from Moses to Joshua and, finally, the death of Moses on Mount Nebo.

Verses 6:4–5 were also quoted by Jesus in Mark 12:28–34 as the Great Commandment.

Structure
Patrick D. Miller in his commentary on Deuteronomy suggests that different views of the structure of the book will lead to different views on what it is about. 

The structure is often described as a series of three speeches or sermons (chapters 1:1–4:43, 4:44–29:1, 29:2–30:20) followed by a number of short appendices – Miller refers to this as the "literary" structure; alternatively, it is sometimes seen as a ring-structure with a central core (chapters 12–26, the Deuteronomic Code) and an inner and an outer frame (chapters 4–11/27–30 and 1–3/31–34) – Miller calls this the covenantal substructure; and finally the theological structure revealed in the theme of the exclusive worship of Yahweh established in the first of the Ten Commandments ("Thou shalt have no other god before me") and the Shema.

Summary

(The following "literary" outline of Deuteronomy is from John Van Seters; it can be contrasted with Alexander Rofé's "covenantal" analysis in his Deuteronomy: Issues and Interpretation.)

Chapters 1–4: The journey through the wilderness from Horeb (Sinai) to Kadesh and then to Moab is recalled.
Chapters 4–11: After a second introduction at 4:44–49 the events at Mount Horeb are recalled, with the giving of the Ten Commandments. Heads of families are urged to instruct those under their care in the law, warnings are made against serving gods other than Yahweh, the land promised to Israel is praised, and the people are urged to obedience.
Chapters 12–26, the Deuteronomic code: Laws governing Israel's worship (chapters 12–16a), the appointment and regulation of community and religious leaders (16b–18), social regulation (19–25), and confession of identity and loyalty (26).
Chapters 27–28: Blessings and curses for those who keep and break the law.
Chapters 29–30: Concluding discourse on the covenant in the land of Moab, including all the laws in the Deuteronomic code (chapters 12–26) after those given at Horeb; Israel is again exhorted to obedience.
Chapters 31–34: Joshua is installed as Moses's successor, Moses delivers the law to the Levites (a priestly caste), and ascends Mount Nebo or Pisgah, where he dies and is buried by God. The narrative of these events is interrupted by two poems, the Song of Moses and the Blessing of Moses.
The final verses, Deuteronomy 34:10–12, "never again did there arise in Israel a prophet like Moses," make a claim for the authoritative Deuteronomistic view of theology and its insistence that the worship of Yahweh as the sole deity of Israel was the only permissible religion, having been sealed by the greatest of prophets.

Deuteronomic code

Deuteronomy 12–26, the Deuteronomic Code, is the oldest part of the book and the core around which the rest developed. It is a series of mitzvot (commands) to the Israelites regarding how they should conduct themselves in the Promised Land. The following list organizes most of the laws into thematic groups:

Laws of religious observance
All sacrifices are to be brought and vows are to be made at a central sanctuary.
The worship of Canaanite gods is forbidden. The order is given to destroy their places of worship and to commit genocide against Canaanites and others with "detestable" religious beliefs.
Native mourning practices such as deliberate disfigurement are forbidden.
The procedure for tithing produce or donating its equivalent is given.
A catalog of which animals are permitted and which are forbidden for consumption is given.
The consumption of animals that are found dead and have not been slaughtered is prohibited.
Sacrificed animals must be without blemish.
First-born male livestock must be sacrificed
The Pilgrimage Festivals of Passover, Shavuot, and Sukkot are instituted.
The worship at Asherah groves and the setting up of ritual pillars are forbidden.
Prohibition of mixing kinds of crops, livestock, and fabrics.
Tzitzit are obligatory.

Laws concerning officials
Judges are to be appointed in every city.
Judges are to be impartial and bribery is forbidden.
A central tribunal is established.
Should the Israelites choose to be ruled by a King, regulations for the office are given.
Regulations of the rights, and revenue, of the Levites are given.
Concerning the future (unspecified) prophet.
Regulations for the priesthood are given.

Civil law
Debts are to be released in the seventh year.
Regulations of the institution of slavery and the procedure for freeing slaves.
Regulations for the treatment of foreign wives taken in war.
Regulations permitting taking slaves and booty in war.
Lost property, once found, is to be restored to its owner
Marriages between women and their stepsons are forbidden.
The camp is to be kept clean.
Usury is forbidden except for gentiles.
Regulations for vows and pledges are given.
The procedure for tzaraath (a disfiguration condition) is given.
Hired workers are to be paid fairly.
Justice is to be shown towards strangers, widows, and orphans.
Portions of crops ("gleaning") are to be given to the poor.

Criminal law
The rules for false witnesses are given.
The procedure for a bride whose virginity has been questioned is given.
Various laws concerning adultery, fornication, and rape are given.
Kidnapping another Israelite is forbidden.
Just weights and measures are obligatory.

Composition

Composition history
The historical background to the book's composition is seen in the following general terms:

 In the late 8th century BCE both Judah and Israel were vassals of Assyria. Israel rebelled and was destroyed c. 722 BCE. Refugees fleeing to Judah brought with them a number of new traditions (new to Judah, at least). One of these was that the god Yahweh, already known and worshiped in Judah, was not merely the most important of the gods, but the only god who should be served. This outlook influenced the Judahite landowning ruling class, which became extremely powerful in court circles after placing the eight-year-old Josiah on the throne following the murder of his father, Amon of Judah.
 By the eighteenth year of Josiah's reign, Assyrian power was in rapid decline, and a pro-independence movement gathered strength in the court. This movement expressed itself in a state theology of loyalty to Yahweh as the sole god of Israel. With Josiah's support, they launched a full-scale reform of worship based on an early form of Deuteronomy 5–26, which takes the form of a covenant between Judah and Yahweh to replace that between Judah and Assyria. This covenant was formulated as an address by Moses to the Israelites (Deuteronomy 5:1). The High Priest of the day, Hilkiah (probably the Prophet Jeremiah's father), discovered in the temple the 'book of the law', which many scholars believe to be a part of Deuteronomy (see 2 Kings 22:8–10).

 The next stage took place during the Babylonian captivity. The destruction of the Kingdom of Judah by Babylon in 586 BCE and the end of kingship was the occasion of much reflection and theological speculation among the Deuteronomistic elite, now in exile in the city of Babylon. The disaster was supposedly Yahweh's punishment of their failure to follow the law, and so they created a history of Israel (the books of Joshua through Kings) to illustrate this.
 At the end of the Exile, when the Persians agreed that the Jews could return and rebuild the Temple in Jerusalem, chapters 1–4 and 29–30 were added and Deuteronomy was made the introductory book to this history, so that a story about a people about to enter the Promised Land became a story about a people about to return to the land. The legal sections of chapters 19–25 were expanded to meet new situations that had arisen, and chapters 31–34 were added as a new conclusion.

Virtually all secular scholars (and most of Christian and Jewish scholars) reject the traditional Mosaic authorship of Deuteronomy and date the book much later, between the 7th and 5th centuries BCE. Its authors were probably the Levite caste, collectively referred to as the Deuteronomist, whose economic needs and social status it reflects.

Chapters 12–26, containing the Deuteronomic Code, are the earliest section. Since the idea was first put forward by W. M. L. de Wette in 1805, most scholars have accepted that this core was composed in Jerusalem in the 7th century BCE in the context of religious reforms advanced by King Josiah (reigned 641–609 BCE), although some have argued for a later date, either during the Babylonian captivity (597–539 BCE) or the Persian period (539–332 BCE). The second prologue (Ch. 5–11) was the next section to be composed, and then the first prologue (Ch. 1–4); the chapters following 26 are similarly layered.

Israel–Judah division
The prophet Isaiah, active in Jerusalem about a century before Josiah, makes no mention of the Exodus, covenants with God, or disobedience to God's laws; in contrast Isaiah's contemporary Hosea, active in the northern kingdom of Israel, makes frequent reference to the Exodus, the wilderness wanderings, a covenant, the danger of foreign gods and the need to worship Yahweh alone; this has led scholars to the view that these traditions behind Deuteronomy have a northern origin. Whether the Deuteronomic code – the set of laws at chapters 12–26 which form the original core of the book – was written in Josiah's time (late 7th century) or earlier is subject to debate, but many of the individual laws are older than the collection itself. The two poems at chapters 32–33 – the Song of Moses and the Blessing of Moses were probably originally independent.

Position in the Hebrew Bible
Deuteronomy occupies a puzzling position in the Bible, linking the story of the Israelites' wanderings in the wilderness to the story of their history in Canaan without quite belonging totally to either. The wilderness story could end quite easily with Numbers, and the story of Joshua's conquests could exist without it, at least at the level of the plot; but in both cases there would be a thematic (theological) element missing. Scholars have given various answers to the problem. The Deuteronomistic history theory is currently the most popular (Deuteronomy was originally just the law code and covenant, written to cement the religious reforms of Josiah, and later expanded to stand as the introduction to the full history); but there is an older theory which sees Deuteronomy as belonging to Numbers, and Joshua as a sort of supplement to it. This idea still has supporters, but the mainstream understanding is that Deuteronomy, after becoming the introduction to the history, was later detached from it and included with Genesis–Exodus–Leviticus–Numbers because it already had Moses as its central character. According to this hypothesis, the death of Moses was originally the ending of Numbers, and was simply moved from there to the end of Deuteronomy.

Themes

Overview
Deuteronomy stresses the uniqueness of God, the need for drastic centralisation of worship, and a concern for the position of the poor and disadvantaged. Its many themes can be organised around the three poles of Israel, Yahweh, and the covenant which binds them together.

Israel
The themes of Deuteronomy in relation to Israel are election, faithfulness, obedience, and Yahweh's promise of blessings, all expressed through the covenant: "obedience is not primarily a duty imposed by one party on another, but an expression of covenantal relationship." Yahweh has elected Israel as his special property (Deuteronomy 7:6 and elsewhere), and Moses stresses to the Israelites the need for obedience to God and covenant, and the consequences of unfaithfulness and disobedience. Yet the first several chapters of Deuteronomy are a long retelling of Israel's past disobedience – but also God's gracious care, leading to a long call to Israel to choose life over death and blessing over curse (chapters 7–11).

Yahweh
Deuteronomy's concept of God changed over time. The earliest 7th century layer is monolatrous; not denying the reality of other gods but enforcing only the worship of Yahweh in Jerusalem. In the later, Exilic layers from the mid-6th century, especially chapter 4, this becomes monotheism, the idea that only one god exists. God is simultaneously present in the Temple and in heaven – an important and innovative concept called "name theology."

After the review of Israel's history in chapters 1 to 4, there is a restatement of the Ten Commandments in chapter 5. This arrangement of material highlights God's sovereign relationship with Israel prior to the giving of establishment of the Law.

Covenant
The core of Deuteronomy is the covenant that binds Yahweh and Israel by oaths of fidelity and obedience. God will give Israel blessings of the land, fertility, and prosperity so long as Israel is faithful to God's teaching; disobedience will lead to curses and punishment. But, according to the Deuteronomists, Israel's prime sin is lack of faith, apostasy: contrary to the first and fundamental commandment ("Thou shalt have no other gods before me") the people have entered into relations with other gods.

Dillard and Longman in their Introduction to the Old Testament stress the living nature of the covenant between Yahweh and Israel as a nation:  The people of Israel are addressed by Moses as a unity, and their allegiance to the covenant is not one of obeisance, but comes out of a pre-existing relationship between God and Israel, established with Abraham and attested to by the Exodus event, so that the laws of Deuteronomy set the nation of Israel apart, signaling the unique status of the Jewish nation. The land is God's gift to Israel, and many of the laws, festivals and instructions in Deuteronomy are given in the light of Israel's occupation of the land. Dillard and Longman note that "In 131 of the 167 times the verb "give" occurs in the book, the subject of the action is Yahweh." Deuteronomy makes the Torah the ultimate authority for Israel, one to which even the king is subject.

Judaism's weekly Torah portions in the Book of Deuteronomy 

Devarim, on Deuteronomy 1–3: Chiefs, scouts, Edom, Ammonites, Sihon, Og, land for two and a half tribes
Va'etchanan, on Deuteronomy 3–7: Cities of refuge, Ten Commandments, Shema, exhortation, conquest instructions
Eikev, on Deuteronomy 7–11: Obedience, taking the land, golden calf, Aaron's death, Levites’ duties
Re'eh, on Deuteronomy 11–16: Centralized worship, diet, tithes, sabbatical year, pilgrim festivals
Shofetim, on Deuteronomy 16–21: Basic societal structure for the Israelites
Ki Teitzei, on Deuteronomy 21–25: Miscellaneous laws on civil and domestic life
Ki Tavo, on Deuteronomy 26–29: First fruits, tithes, blessings and curses, exhortation
Nitzavim, on Deuteronomy 29–30: covenant, violation, choose blessing and curse
Vayelech, on Deuteronomy 31: Encouragement, reading and writing the law
Haazinu, on Deuteronomy 32: Punishment, punishment restrained, parting words
V'Zot HaBerachah, on Deuteronomy 33–34: Farewell blessing and death of Moses

Influence on Judaism and Christianity

Judaism

It continues, "Thou shalt love the  thy God with all thy heart and all thy soul and all thy might";  it has therefore also become identified with the central Jewish concept of the love of God, and the rewards that come as a result.

Christianity

In the Gospel of Matthew, Jesus cited Deuteronomy 6:5 as a Great Commandment. The earliest Christian authors interpreted Deuteronomy's prophecy of the restoration of Israel as having been fulfilled (or superseded) in Jesus Christ and the establishment of the Christian Church (Luke 1–2, Acts 2–5), and Jesus was interpreted to be the "one (i.e., prophet) like me" predicted by Moses in Deuteronomy 18:15 (Acts 3:22–23). While the exact position of Paul the Apostle and Judaism is still debated, a common view is that in place of mitzvah set out in Deuteronomy, Paul the Apostle, drawing on Deuteronomy 30:11–14, claimed that the keeping of the Mosaic covenant was superseded by faith in Jesus and the gospel (the New Covenant).

See also
 613 commandments
 Documentary hypothesis
 Hebrew Bible
 Kashrut
 Mosaic authorship
 Old Deuteronomy - Refers to a character in a play called "Cats" this has nothing to do with the Bible.
 Papyrus Rylands 458 – the oldest Greek manuscript of Deuteronomy

Citations

General and cited references

Translations
 Deuteronomy in NIV
 Deuteronomy in Tanakh (Hebrew Bible)

Commentaries
 
 
 
 Plaut, W. Gunther (1981). The Torah: A Modern Commentary.

General
 
 
 
 
 
 
 
 
 Clements, Ronald (1968). God's Chosen People: A Theological Interpretation of the Book of Deuteronomy. In series, Religious Book Club, 182. London: S.C.M. Press.
 
 Gottwald, Norman, review of Stephen L. Cook, The Social Roots of Biblical Yahwism, Society of Biblical Literature, 2004
 
 Gili Kugler, Kugler, Moses died and the people moved on - a hidden narrative in Deuteronomy

External links

 Deuteronomy at Bible Gateway
 
 
 Jewish translations:
 Deuteronomy at Mechon-Mamre (modified Jewish Publication Society translation)
 Deuteronomy (The Living Torah) Rabbi Aryeh Kaplan's translation and commentary at Ort.org
 Devarim – Deuteronomy (Judaica Press) translation [with Rashi's commentary] at Chabad.org
 דְּבָרִים Devarim – Deuteronomy (Hebrew – English at Mechon-Mamre.org)
 Christian translations:
 Online Bible at GospelHall.org (King James Version)
 oremus Bible Browser (New Revised Standard Version)
 oremus Bible Browser (Anglicized New Revised Standard Version)
 Deuteronomy at Wikisource (Authorized King James Version)
  Various versions

 
7th-century BC books
6th-century BC books
Non-fiction books about genocide
Phoenicians in the Hebrew Bible
The Exodus
5